K XV was one of five K XIV class submarines built for the Royal Netherlands Navy. She served during World War II.

Service history
The submarine was laid down in Rotterdam at the shipyard of Rotterdamsche Droogdok Maatschappij on 31 May 1930. The launch took place on 10 December 1932.
On 30 December 1933 the boat was commissioned in the Dutch navy.

On 7 February  1934 K XV and   left the Netherlands for the Dutch East Indies. The route they took led through the Suez Canal.
On 6 September 1938 she participated in a fleet show at Surabaya. The show was held in honor of the Dutch Queen Wilhelmina of the Netherlands who was than 40 years the head of state. More than twenty navy ships participate in the show.

In the war K XV sank several Japanese ships. She survived the war and was decommissioned on 23 April 1946. 1 June 1946 she was stricken and sold for scrap in December 1950.

Summary of raiding history
Ships sunk and damaged by K XV.

References

1932 ships
Ships built in Rotterdam
K XIV-class submarines
Submarines built by Rotterdamsche Droogdok Maatschappij